Wind power in Alaska has the potential to provide all of the electricity used in the U.S. state of Alaska.

Potential production

In early 2010, the National Renewable Energy Laboratory released the first comprehensive update of wind energy potential by state since 1993, showing that Alaska has the potential to install 494,700 MW of wind power, capable of generating 1,620,000 million kWh/year. Alaska used 6,291 million kWh in 2011.

Projects

Eva Creek Wind Project
Fire Island Wind Project
Pillar Mountain Wind Project

Statistics
The following is a table comparing the growth of wind power installed nameplate capacity in MW for Alaska and the entire United States by year from 1999 through 2019.

See also

Solar power in Alaska
Wind power in the United States
Renewable energy in the United States

References

External links

Renewable Energy Projects